The discography of Yo La Tengo, an indie rock band based in Hoboken, New Jersey, consists of seventeen studio albums, six compilation albums, sixteen extended plays, twenty-two singles, two film score albums, four collaborative albums, and one album of cover songs.

Albums

Studio albums

Compilation albums

Film score albums

Collaborative albums

Other albums

Extended plays

Singles

Music videos

Songs

Originals

Covers

Notes

References

External links
 Annotated Discography
 Yo La Tengo discography fan page
 Yo La Tengo discography at Discogs

discog
Discographies of American artists
Rock music group discographies